Uninvited Guest is a 1999 thriller film written and directed by Timothy Wayne Folsome. It stars Mekhi Phifer, Mari Morrow and Malinda Williams.

Plot 
The film begins with children playing outside when a stranger walks by and robs a store. After Mecca (Kim Fields) pulls out a shotgun, the stranger shoots and kills her.

The scene then opens when Debbie (Mari Morrow) and Howard (Mel Jackson) are celebrating their wedding anniversary. A special night together turns into a nightmare when Howard, Mo (Wanya Morris) and Tre (William Christopher Stephens) they heard a knock on their door. Tre opens the door lets a man named Silk (Mekhi Phifer) into the house to use the phone after his car broke down. Besides the car trouble that brought him to the door, he also brings along a string of frightening murders.

Debbie then finds out that her husband and best friend Tammy (Malinda Williams) set a hit on her, just to earn a lot of money. However, all of that backfires on everyone, especially Debbie. Howard accidentally shoots Debbie, much to everyone's shock. Silk then crawls towards her, but Howard warned him to get away from her, Silk simply replies. Howard then shoots him in the head, ending the stranger's life.

Cast

Production 
The film was produced in Columbus, Reynoldsburg, Grandview Heights and Youngstown, Ohio.  The artwork featured in the film was by Robert S. Wright, a central Ohio artist. A soundtrack was released in February 2001.

References

External links 
 Uninvited Guest at Internet Movie Database

1999 films
African-American films
1999 thriller films
1990s English-language films